Scotland and the Barbarians have played each other on 11 occasions. The Barbarians have won eight matches, Scotland two and one match drawn. All but one of the matches have been played at Murrayfield, Edinburgh, the home of Scottish rugby.

Overall summary

Matches

Barbarian F.C. matches
Scotland national rugby union team matches